Plumer Barracks was a military installation at Plymouth.

History
The barracks were built as "Crownhill Barracks" to accommodate regiments in transit for operations overseas in 1891 and expanded with additional barrack blocks towards the end of the First World War. They were renamed "Plumer Barracks" after Field Marshal Lord Plumer in the early 1930s and then used by the United States Army during the Second World War. The barracks were demolished in the late 1960s: the site is now occupied by a large office block known as "Plumer House" which initially accommodated the Land Registry but which is now used by Plymouth Community Homes as offices.

References

Barracks in England
Installations of the British Army